This article lists events that occurred during 1927 in Estonia.

Incumbents

Events
1 January – the currency was changed: the marks were replaced by the krones.
Chemical industry started to use oil shale.
 –

Births

Deaths

References

 
1920s in Estonia
Estonia
Estonia
Years of the 20th century in Estonia